Santoshpur Union is a union parishad of Chitalmari Upazila, Bagerhat District in Khulna Division of Bangladesh. It has an area of 23.31 km2 (9.00 sq mi) and a population of 21,736.

References

Unions of Chitalmari Upazila
Unions of Bagerhat District
Unions of Khulna Division